Jeff Hammoud is a Canadian designer of Lebanese descent. A native of Guelph, Ontario, he studied in the College for Creative Studies in Detroit from where he graduated in 2004. Contracted by Chrysler, he worked in the company's design studios in Michigan. Hammoud designed the Jeep Grand Cherokee model unveiled in 2011 and the 2015 Chrysler 200.

References

Year of birth missing (living people)
Living people
Canadian designers
Canadian people of Lebanese descent